Maulika Kayastha is a sub caste in the Hindu religion in Bengal. The Bengali Kayasthas are subdivided into different classes or ranks and also divided in terms of their geographical locations.  According to legend, the Bengali Hindu King Ballala Sena started the ranking system of Brahmins, Kayasthas and Baidyas. The highest ranked Brahmins and Kayasthas are known as Kulin Brahmins and Kulin Kayasthas, respectively, and those Kayasthas not considered to be Kulins are designated Maulikas, Mauliks, Mouliks or Moulikas.

References

Kayastha
Bengali Hindu castes